The Emilia's marmoset (Mico emiliae), also known as Snethlage's marmoset, is a marmoset endemic to Brazil. It is found only in the Brazilian states of Pará and Mato Grosso. It was named to honour German-born Brazilian ornithologist Emilie Snethlage.

References

Emilia's marmoset
Mammals of Brazil
Endemic fauna of Brazil
Emilia's marmoset
Emilia's marmoset